Hamilton Croatia is a Croatian Canadian amateur soccer team founded in Hamilton, Ontario, Canada in 1957. It is supported by the Croatian Sports and Community Centre of Hamilton Inc. (formerly the Croatian National Sports Club of Hamilton, Inc.).

The team plays in the Hamilton & District Premier Soccer League's Elite Division.

Hamilton Croatia also competes annually in such competitions as the Ontario Cup, various League Cups, the Hamilton Spectator Cup, and the Croatian National Soccer Federation's North American Tournament held every Labour Day weekend at sites across Canada and the United States. In 2016, Hamilton was inducted as the club of distinction into the Hamilton Soccer Hall of Fame.

In September 2011, Hamilton Croatia hosted the 48th Annual Croatian National Soccer Federation of Canada & U.S.A’s Men’s Soccer Tournament.  It was widely considered the most successful tournament in recent years.

History

The organization was formed in 1957 as the Sports Club Croatia Hamilton, and competed in the Inter-City League under the guidance of Stjepan Stanković. The club debuted in a match against Hamilton Sparta 2-1, with Pavle Usenica scoring the first-ever goal in club history. Throughout its history Hamilton Croatia hosted international friendly matches with Croatian club teams such as 1967 Inter-Cities Fairs Cup winners Dinamo Zagreb, NK Medjugorje, NK Croatia Brihovo, NK Vukovar '91, NK Karlovac, HSK Zrinjski Mostar, as well as Vasas Budapest SC, one of Hungary's major sports clubs.

Some notable Croatian players to have worn a Hamilton Croatia jersey were Zeljko Adzic, Slavko Cetina, Vlado Crnjak, Berislav Krilic, Stjepan Loparic, Vlado Palijan, Ivica Tankovic, Robert Prosinecki and Nediljko Simic. Notable non-Croat players included 1976 Canadian Olympians Kevin Grant and Olympic team captain Jimmy Douglas, as well as former United Soccer Leagues First Division All-Star Jamie Dodds. During this period Hamilton added several pieces of silverware to their cabinet acquiring titles like the Inter-City League title, the Hamilton Spectator Cup, and the Croatian National Soccer Federation's North American Tournament title.

In 1970, Hamilton Croatia went professional by entering the National Soccer League, where in their debut season they claimed the NSL Championship by defeating regular season champions Toronto Croatia. Throughout their six-year tenure in the NSL, Hamilton managed to achieve a successful run within the league finishing in the second, and third positions for three seasons.

During the 1980s and 1990s the team was coached by John Zefkić, and Zvonko Zubrinić, where the club won several championships within the Hamilton & District Premier Soccer League. Hamilton would also compete in the Ontario Soccer League, winning two division titles in 2008, and 2009, and head coach Ron Davidson winning the OSL Coach of the Year award in 2009.

Canadian Soccer League 
On January 22, 2010, Hamilton Croatia was selected as one of the newly expansion franchise to compete in the Canadian Soccer League. Becoming the second professional Hamilton club to compete in the CSL, with Hamilton Thunder preceding them. The club's home venue would be Brian Timmis Stadium. OSL Coach of the Year Ron Davidson would lead the team. Davidson would sign several USL veterans like Jamie Dodds, Said Ali, and Alvin Hudson. He also brought in Ivan Razumović, Peter Tereanszki-Toth, Rhian Dodds, Preston Corporal, Antonijo Zupan, and Aidan O'Keeffe, players with international experience.

Hamilton made their debut in the CSL on May 15, 2010, in a match against TFC Academy, where they won the match by a score of 2-1. The Croatian side started off the season with a six-game undefeated streak. Hamilton would finish third in the overall standings with the best offensive record within the league. Croatia qualified for the postseason and faced TFC Academy in the quarterfinals where in the first match Hamilton won the match by a score of 2-1 with goals coming from Corporal, and Razumovic. In the second leg Hamilton finished off the series with a 1-0 victory with the lone goal coming from Liberian international Preston Corporal.

In the next round Hamilton faced rivals Toronto Croatia in a well attended match where Hamilton triumphed with a 2-0 victory advancing the club to the CSL Championship finals. In the CSL Championship finals Hamilton faced Brantford Galaxy, but lost the match to a score of 3-0. At the conclusion of the season Ron Davidson was awarded the CSL Coach of the Year award. On February 11, 2011, the club's executive board announced a parting of ways with the league due to philosophical differences with the CSL.

Past achievements

References

External links 
 

Canadian Soccer League (1998–present) teams
Croatian-Canadian culture
Croatian sports clubs outside Croatia
Canadian National Soccer League teams
Association football clubs established in 1957
Soccer clubs in Hamilton, Ontario
1957 establishments in Ontario
Diaspora sports clubs in Canada